
This is a list of films produced by Shaw Brothers Studios. Films that were distributed but not produced by the studio are not included in this list.

1951 - 1952 -
1953 - 1954 -
1955 - 1956 -
1957 - 1958 -
1959

1960 - 1961 -
1962 - 1963 -
1964 - 1965 -
1966 - 1967 -
1968 - 1969

1970 - 1971 -
1972 - 1973 -
1974 - 1975 -
1976 - 1977 -
1978 - 1979

1980 - 1981 -
1982 - 1983 -
1984 - 1985 -
1988 - 1989

1990 - 1992 - 
1993 - 1994
1995 - 1996 - 
1997

2003 - 2009

2010 - 2011

1951
13 Grand Tutors

1952

Sweet Memories
Good Faith
Back Home Again
Sweet Song For You
Destroy
A Double-Faced Man
Tomorrow
Anything Can Happen

1953

Heaven of Love
A Midsummer Night's Love
Meal Time
Green Heaven
A Song to Remember
Little Couple
The 3rd Life
Black Gloves

1954

Wind Withers
Girl On The Loose
Beyond the Grave
Girls in Transformation
Temptation

1955

Chin Ping Mei
Forever Goodbye
Love & Obligation
Che Sin Ching
The Feud

1956

Our Lovely Baby
The Error
A Lonely Heart
Meet Me After Spring
The Orphan Girl
The Secret of a Married Woman
Our Good Daughter
Beyond The Blue Horizon
Siren, Part 1
Siren, Part 2
Autumn Affair
The Chase

1957

A Mating Story
The Greatest Circus On Earth
Lady In Distress
The Dances of Charm
Springtime In Paradise
Miss Evening Sweet
Frosty Night
A Mellow Spring
He Has Taken Him For Another
A Marriage For Love
The Lady of Mystery
You Are My Soul

1958

The Circus
Love With An Alien
A Kiss For Me
Diau Charn
An Appointment After Dark
The Angel
The Unforgettable Night
Red Lantern
Dan Fung Street
The Blessed Family
The Magic Touch
Where Is My Bride

1959

 Full of Joy
 Love Letter Murder
 Stolen Love
 Black Gold
 Love & War
 Day-Time Husband
 Enchanted Melody
 The Vengeance of the Vampire
 Darling Daughter
 The Kingdom & The Beauty
 The Other Woman
 Spring Frolic
 The Pink Murder
 Appointment With Death
 Desire
 The Adventure of the 13th Sister

1960

Eve of the Wedding
Flames of Passion
The Deformed
Rendezvous In The South Sea
Twilight hours
Malayan Affair
A Shot In The Dark
Rear Entrance
My Daughter, My Daughter
East Flows The River
Street Boys
Love Thy Neighbor
How To Marry A Millionaire
The Secret of Miss Pai
When The Peach Blossoms Bloom
Kiss Me Again
The Enchanting Shadow

1961

All The Best
Les Belles
I, Murder
The Swallow
Oh Boys! Oh Girls!
Kiss For Sale
The 3 Ladies of Hong Kong
The Lost Love
The Girl Next Door
The Fair Sex
The Golden Trumpet
The Husband's Secret
The Rose of Summer
Till the Clouds Roll By
Love Without End
The Pistol
When The Poles Meet

1962

The Mix-Up
Yang Kwei Fei
Dream of the Red Chamber
Madam White Snake
The Tryst
When Fortune Smiles
The Black Fox
Mid-Nightmare

1963

Mid-Nightmare-2
To Catch A Murderer
Love Parade
3 Dolls of Hong Kong
The Second Spring
Revenge of a Swordswoman
The Love Eterne
Her Sister's Keeper
My Lucky Star
Empress Wu Tse-Tien
Bitter Sweet
Return of the Phoenix
The Adultress
Stepmother
The Lady & The Thief
3 Sinners
A Maid from Heaven

1964 

 Between Tears and Smiles
 Dancing Millionairess
 The Coin (1964 film)
 Amorous Lotus Pan
 Comedy of Mismatches
 Lady General Hua Mu-lan
 The Shepherd Girl《山歌戀》(Shan Ge Lian)
 Last Woman of Shang
 Black Forest
 Story of Sue San
 Lover's Rock
 The Crimson Palm
 Beyond The Great Wall
 Female Prince
 The Warlord & The Actress

1965

The Mermaid
Song Fest
Butterfly Chalice

The Grand Substitution
Song of Orchid Island
Pink Tears
Crocodile River
Lotus Lamp
The Lark
Vermillion Door
Hong Kong, Manilia, Singapore
Temple of the Red Lotus
Inside the Forbidden City
Call of the Sea
The West Chamber
Squadron '77
Move Over Darling
Twin Swords

1966

 The Monkey
 Tiger Boy
 The Dawn Will Come
 Till the End of Time
 Come Drink with Me
 The Golden Buddha
 Knight of Knights
 The Blue & The Black
 The Blue & The Black 2
 Princess Iron Fan
 Sweet and Wild
 The Mating Season
 Rose, Be My Love
 Poisonous Rose
 Magnificent Trio
 The Perfumed Arrow
 The Joy of Spring

1967

Pearl Phoenix
Hong Kong Nocturne
That Man In Chang-An
Madame Slender Plum

Trail of the Broken Blade

Too Late for Love

Moonlight Serenade
The Sword & The Lute

4 Sisters

Sweet Is Revenge

Sing High, Sing Low
King With My Face
Interpol
Dragon Creek
That Tender Age
The One-Armed Swordsman (獨臂刀)
Purple Shell
The Mirror
Kiss & Kill
Cave of the Silken Web (盤絲洞)
Midnight Murder

Silent Swordsman
Swan Song

Song of Tomorrow
Susanna
Trapeze Girl
Rape of the Sword
The Mirror & The Lychee
King Drummer
Summons To Death
King Cat
Lady Jade Lockett
The Assassin
The Bandits

1968

Mist Over Dream Lake
Forever & Ever
Land of Many Perfumes
Hong Kong Rhapsody
Gun Brother
Black Butterfly

Golden Swallow
a.k.a. U.K. title: The Girl With The Thunderbolt Kick
Flower Blossoms
Magnificent Swordsman
Killer Darts
Fallen Petals
Angel Strikes Again
Bells of Death
Forever Diamonds
The Rainbow
That Fiery Girl
Sword of Swords
3 Swinging Girls
Double Trouble
Death Valley
When the Clouds Roll By
Summer Heat
Jade Raksha
Enchanted Chamber
The Fastest Sword
The Brain-Stealers
Divorce, Hong Kong Style

1969

Twin Blades of Doom
Tomorrow Is Another Day
Killers 5
The Singing Thief
Return of the One-Armed Swordsman
Unfinished Melody
12 Deadly Coins
Dragon Swamp
Temptress of a Thousand Faces
Dear Murderer
Dark Semester
Diary of a Lady Killer
Millionaire Chase
Flying Daggers
Partisan Lovers
Invincible Fist
Dead End
Vengeance Is A Golden Blade
Raw Courage
Singing Escort
Raw Passions
The Three Smiles
The Swordmates
Golden Sword
Torrents of Desire
Farewell, My Love
River of Tears
Dark Rendezvous
Have Sword, Will Travel
Tropical Interlude

1970

Ripples
A Cause To Kill
Naked Love
The Wandering Swordsman
Double Bliss
Who's Baby's In The Classroom
The Winged Tiger
Lady of Steel
Younger Generation
The 5 Billion Dollar Legacy
Brothers Five
A Place To Call Home
Golden Knight
Heads For Sale
Vengeance
a.k.a. U.S. title: Kung Fu Vengeance
Young Lovers
Hellgate
My Son
The Twelve Gold Medallions
Love Without End
Swordswomen 3
The Heroic Ones
a.k.a. U.S. title: The Shaolin Masters
Love Song Over The Sea
Guess Who Killed My 12 Lovers
A Taste of Cold Steel
The Orchid
Valley of the Fangs
A Time for Love
Secret of the Dirk
Price of Love
The Iron Buddha
Apartment for Ladies
The Chinese Boxer
a.k.a. U.S. title: The Hammer of God
The Singing Killer
Drinking Knight
Common Families
Love for Sale

1971

King Eagle

New One-Armed Swordsman
a.k.a. U.S. title: Triple Irons

Mission Impossible, originally Jian nu you hun 
It Takes A Man To Be Henpecked
6 Assassins
Silent Love
The Jade Faced Assassin
Long Road To Freedom
The Duel
a.k.a. U.S. title: Duel of the Iron Fist
The Eunuch
Thousand Years Fox
The Long Years (film)
Merciful Sword
Man With 2 Wives
Golden Seal
The Lady Professional
Redbeard
The Crimson Charm
Anonymous Heroes
The Shadow Whip
We Love Millionaires
Swift Knight
Night Is Young (1971 film)
Shadow Girl
The Rescue
Duel of Fists
Lady with a Sword
Swordsman At Large

Duel for Gold
Sunset
Come Haunt With Me
Oath of Death
The Deadly Duo
Long Chase
Dragon Tiger Meet
Mighty One
Sword Hand
Flying Flag
Nocturnal Killer
Girl of Ghost Valley

1972

The Killer
a.k.a. U.S. title: The Sacred Knives of Vengeance
Yellow Muffler
The Champion of Champions
The Black Enforcer
Boxer from Shantung
a.k.a. U.S. title: The Killer from Shantung
Angry Guest
a.k.a. U.S. title: The Kung Fu Killers
Human Goddess
The Water Margin, originally Shui hu zhuan
a.k.a. U.S. title: Seven Blows of the Dragon
The Bride from Hell
The Casino
Finger of Doom, originally Tai yin zhi
The Young Avenger
5 Fingers of Death, originally Tian xia di yi quan 
a.k.a. U.K. title: King Boxer
a.k.a. international title: Invincible Boxer 

Of Wives & Mistresses
Pursuit
Merry Wife
The Devil's Mirror
Let's Go to Bed
The Deadly Knives
a.k.a. U.S. title: The Fists of Vengeance
Young People
The Gourd Fairy
14 Amazons
The Warlord
Intimate Confessions of a Chinese Courtesan (愛奴) 
Delightful Forest
Flower in the Rain
Imperial Swordsman
Man of Iron
a.k.a. U.S. title: Warrior of Steel
Stranger In Hong Kong
The Lizard
Intrigue In Nylons
Legends of Lust (風月奇譚)
The Fugitive
Black Tavern
4 Riders
a.k.a. U.S. title: Strike 4 Revenge
a.k.a. U.K. title: Hellfighters of the East
Thunderbolt Fist

1973

Ambush
The Champion
a.k.a. U.S. title: Shanghai Lil And The Sun Luck Kid
Call to Arms, originally Dao bing fu
Love Across the Seas
Tales of Larcency, originally Niu gui she shen
The Delinquent
a.k.a. U.S. title: Street Gangs of Hong Kong
Blood Brothers
a.k.a. U.S. title: Dynasty of Blood 
a.k.a. U.K. title: Chinese Vengeance
The Villains
Sexy Girls of Denmark, originally Dan Ma jiao wa
a.k.a. The Dollies of Denmark
Imperial Tombs Raiders
Facets of Love
Generation Gap
River of Fury
Kiss of Death, originally Du nu
The Bastard
The Escaper
The Boxers
Police Force
The Virgins
The Big Fellow (1973 film)
Payment in Blood
The Pirate
Illicit Desire
Sexy Playgirls
Na Cha and the 7 Devils
Master of Kung Fu
The House of 72 Tenants
The Happiest Moment
Sugar Daddies
Iron Bodyguard
The Bamboo House of Dolls
This Time I'll Make You Rich
Hill Fortress

1974

Crazy Nuts of Kung Fu
Village of Tigers
The Golden Lotus
Heroes Two, originally Hung Hsi-Kuan And Fang Shi-Yu
a.k.a. U.S. title: Kung Fu Invaders
Killer Snakes
The Savage Five
Sinful Adultress
Shadow Boxer
Ghost Lovers
Thirteen
Sex, Love, & Hate
Men from the Monastery, originally Shao Lin zi di
a.k.a. U.S. title: Disciples of Death
a.k.a. U.K. title: Dragon's Teeth
Scandal, originally Chou wen
Hong Kong '73
The Drug Addict, originally Xi du zhe
Gossip Street
Rivals of Kung Fu
Crazy Bumpkins
Sex For Sale
Virgins of the Seven Seas 
a.k.a. U.S. title: The Bod Squad
a.k.a. German title: Karate, Küsse, Blonde Katzen
Friends, originally Peng you
Cheeky Little Angels
The Legend of the 7 Golden Vampires
a.k.a. Dracula and the 7 Golden Vampires
a.k.a. U.S. title: The 7 Brothers Meet Dracula
Shatter
a.k.a. U.S. title: Call Him Mr. Shatter
Sorrow of the Gentry
Shaolin Martial Arts
Sinful Confessions
Mini-Skirt Gang
a.k.a. Danish title: Bikini Banden
Supermen Against the Orient
a.k.a. original Italian title: Crash! Che Botte! Strippo, Strappo, Stroppio
Young Lovers On Flying Wheels
Na Cha the Great
Young Passion
The Tea House
Women of Desire
Ghost Eyes
5 Tough Guys
a.k.a. U.S. title: Kung Fu Hellcats
Kidnap, originally Tian wang
Rat Catcher
2 Faces of Love
Five Shaolin Masters
a.k.a. U.S. title: The 5 Masters of Death
Blood Money
a.k.a. U.S. title: The Stranger and the Gunfighter 
a.k.a. El Karate, El Colt y El Impostor

1975

Forbidden Tales of Two Cities
Quenn Hustler
Happy Trio
The Young Rebel
a.k.a. The Rebel Youth
Flying Guillotine
Temperament of Life
The Hooker and the Hustler
Night of the Devil's Bride
The Empress Dowager
Love's Destiny
Gambling Syndicate
2 Con Men
Salina
All Men Are Brothers 
a.k.a. U.S. title: The Seven Soldiers of Kung Fu
Cohabitation
Return of the Crazy Bumpkins
Lady of the Law
Evil Seducers
Well of Doom
Disciples of Shaolin
a.k.a. U.S. title: The Invincible One
My Bewitched Wife
Big Brother Cheng
The Super Inframan
a.k.a. The Chinese Superman
a.k.a. U.S. title: Infra-Man
Super Stooges vs. the Wonder Women 
The Imposter
The Fantastic Magic Baby
a.k.a. Red Boy
Taxi Driver
Girl's Diary
Fearful Interlude
The Big Holdup
All Mixed Up
Black Magic
Thief of Thieves
Carry On Con Men
Bloody Escape
Romance In Paris
Cleopatra Jones and the Casino of Gold
a.k.a. The Dragon Lady
That's Adultery
The Spiritual Boxer
a.k.a. U.S. title: The Naked Fists of Terror
Girl With the Long Hair
The Golden Lion
Cuties Parade
Marco Polo, originally Ma Ko Po Lo
a.k.a. U.S. title: The 4 Assassins

1976

Springtime in Pattaya
I Love You, Bruce Lee
a.k.a. Bruce Lee And I
a.k.a. U.S. title: Bruce Lee - His Last Days, His Last Nights
The Criminals
Heroes of the Underground
Boxer Rebellion
a.k.a. international title: The Spiritual Fists
a.k.a. U.S. title: The Bloody Avengers
Big Time For the Crazy Bumpkins
Drug Connection
a.k.a. DVD title: The Sexy Killer
The Last Tempest
Oriental Playgirls, originally Ming nu ren ji yi lu
Spirit of the Raped
Killer Clans
Wedding Nights
7-Man Army, originally Ba dao lou zi
a.k.a. Fortress At The 8 Path Crossroads
a.k.a. The 7-Man Army
Dragon Missile
Erotic Nights
Challenge of the Masters
Beautiful Vixen
The Condemned
Emperor Chien Lung
Shaolin Avengers
a.k.a. U.S. title: The Invincible Kung Fu Brothers
Crazy Sex, originally Nian hua re cao
The Magic Blade
Brotherhood
Snake Prince
Hustler from Canton
Homicides: The Criminals, Part II, originally Xiong sha
Killers on Wheels
New Shaolin Boxers
a.k.a. U.S. title: Demon Fists of Kung Fu
a.k.a. VHS title: Grandmaster of Death
The Mad Boy
Love Swindlers
Oily Maniac
Girls For Sale
Mr. Funny Bone
a.k.a. Old Master Q
Big Bad Sis
Escort Girl
Web of Death
a.k.a. Five Poisons
Girlie Bar
King Gambler
Farewell to a Warrior
Black Magic 2
a.k.a. U.S. title: Revenge of the Zombies
Crazy Bumpkins in Singapore
Shaolin Temple 
a.k.a. U.S. title: Death Chamber

1977

Moods of Love
The Crooks
Lady Exterminator
Return of the Con Man
Arson: The Criminals 3
Executioners from Shaolin
a.k.a. U.S. title: The Executioners of Death
Clans of Intrigue
Mysterious Lady Killer
Deadly Angels
The Naval Commandos
Romantic Scholar
Murder On the Wedding Night
Jade Tiger
Confessions of a Private Secretary
Magnificent Wanderers
a.k.a. U.S. title: The Magnificent Kung Fu Warriors
Adventures of Emperor Chien Lung
Assault: The Criminals 4
Cobra Girl
a.k.a. Fangs of the Cobra
Death Duel
To Kill A Jaguar
The Brave Archer
a.k.a. U.S. title: Kung Fu Warlords
The Mighty Peking Man
a.k.a. U.S. title: Goliathon
Judgement of an Assassin
The Battle Wizard
Starlets For Sale
The Call Girls
Sentimental Swordsman
Dream of the Red Chamber
Teenager's Nightmare
Dreams of Eroticism
Chinatown Kid
Innocent Lust
Pursuit of Vengeance
The Mad Monk

1978

Gang of Four
The Flying Guillotine 2
The 36th Chamber of Shaolin, originally Shao Lin san shi liu fang
a.k.a. U.S. title: The Master Killer
Clans of Amazons
Vengeful Beauty
Mad Monk Strikes Again
Proud Youth
The Psychopath
Soul of the Sword
Delinquent Teenagers
The Brave Archer 2 
a.k.a. U.S. title: Kung Fu Warlords Part II
Shaolin Handlock
The Deadly Mantis
a.k.a. Shaolin Mantis
Legends of the Bat
a.k.a. U.S. title: Bat Island Adventure
Cunning Hustler
Five Deadly Venoms
a.k.a. Five Venoms
a.k.a. Shaolin Deadly Poisons
Sensual Pleasure
Notorious Frame-Up
Hello Sexy Late Homecomers
Avenging Eagle
Crazy Imposters
The Voyage of Emperor Chien Lung
Heaven Sword and Dragon Sabre
Heaven Sword & Dragon Sabre 2
Double Cross
Swordsman and the Enchantress
Mr. Funnybone Strikes Again
Invincible Shaolin
a.k.a. U.S. title: Unbeatable Dragon
The Big Robberies 
a.k.a. Bank-Buster
Crippled Avengers
a.k.a. U.S. title: Mortal Combat
a.k.a. DVD title: The Return of the 5 Deadly Venoms 
Heroes of the East 
a.k.a. U.S. title: Challenge of the Ninja
a.k.a. U.K. title: Shaolin Challenges Ninja
The Extra Hand
Ku Ling Ching Kuai Hsiao Kuei Tou
San Shan Wu Yu Jen Ma

1979

Foxy Ladies
Best Hustler Wins

Scandalous Warlord
Spiritual Boxer 2
Life Gamble
Ghost Story
Young Lovers
Reckless Cricket
Shaolin Rescuers
Last Judgement
The Deadly Breaking Sword
The Brothers
Monkey Kung Fu
a.k.a. U.S. title: The Stroke of Death
He Who Never Dies
Legend of Feng Hsiu
Murder Plot
The Kung Fu Instructor
Shaolin Daredevils
Abbot of Shaolin
The Proud Twins
Dirty Ho
What Price Honesty
Naughty Scandals
The Ghost and I
5 Superfighters
Tigress of Shaolin
Magnificent Ruffians
Mad Monkey Kung Fu
Kid with the Golden Arm
Invincible Enforcer
To Kill a Mastermind
Forbidden Pest
Return of the Dead
Fighting Fool
Boxer from the Temple
a.k.a. U.S. title: The Boxer from Shaolin

1980

Clan of the White Lotus, originally Hung wen tin san po pai lien chiao
a.k.a. U.S. title: Fists of the White Lotus
Heaven and Hell
a.k.a. U.S. title: Shaolin Hellgate
Disco Bumpkins
Emperor Chien Lung and the Beauty
Convict Killer
a.k.a. U.S. title: The Iron Chain Assassin
Killer Constable
a.k.a. U.S. title: Karate Exterminator
Ten Tigers of Kwangtung
The Tiger  and the Widow
2 Champions of Shaolin, originally Shaolín yu wu dang
a.k.a. U.S. title: 2 Champions of Death
The Informer
The Master
a.k.a. U.S. title: The 3 Evil Masters
Coward Bastard
Kid With A Tattoo
a.k.a. U.S. title: Claw of the Eagle
Hex
Heroes Shed No Tears
Swift Sword
Flag of Iron
a.k.a. U.S. title: The Spearman of Death
A Deadly Secret
Pei Chen Hsiao-Tzu
The Sword of Vengeance
The Rebel Intruders
a.k.a. U.S. title: Killer Army
Rendezvous With Death
Lost Souls
Legend of the Fox
Hex Versus Witchcraft
Bat Without Wings
Return to the 36th Chamber
a.k.a. U.S. title: Return of the Master Killer
Young Outcasts

1981

Return of the Sentimental Swordsman
My Young Auntie
a.k.a. U.S. title: Kung Fu Concubine
Sexy Career Girls
Lion Vs. Lion
a.k.a. U.S. title: Roar of the Lion
Sword Stained with Royal Blood
Challenge of the Gamesters
Avengers from Hell
Revenge of the Corpse
Masked Avengers
Murderer Pursues
Corspe Mania
Treasure Hunters
a.k.a. U.S. title: Master of Disaster
The Emperor and His Brother
One Heart, One Spirit
Martial Club
a.k.a. U.S. title: The Instructors of Death
One Way Only
Bewitched
Notorious 8
Family of Lust
Mobfix Patrol
Battle for the Republic of China
Bloody Parrot
The Duel of the Century
The Brave Archer 3
a.k.a. U.S. title: Blast of the Iron Palm
Black Lizard
Mahjong Heroes
Godfather from Canton
Ambitious Kung Fu Girl
Gang Master
Ying Lu Tuo Yang Ping

1982

Legendary Weapons of China
a.k.a. U.S. title: Legendary Weapons of Kung Fu
House of Traps
a.k.a. U.S. title: Deadly Shaolin Traps
Winner Takes All
The Brave Archer and His Mate
a.k.a. Mysterious Island
Clan Feuds
Rolls, Rolls, I Love You
Five Element Ninjas
a.k.a. U.S. title: Super Ninjas
Passing Flickers
Perils of the Sentimental Swordsman
Lover's Blades
Hell Has No Boundary
Hex After Hex
Spirit of the Sword
Fake Ghost Catchers
a.k.a. Kung Fu Ghostbusters
Kid from Kwang Tung
Human Lanterns
Buddha's Palm
Cat vs. Rat
Brothers from the Walled City
Curse of Evil
2.5 CM Young Heroes of the Street
Tiger Killer
The Pure and the Evil
My Rebellious Son
a.k.a. Raging Tiger
Emperor and the Minister
Descendant of the Sun
Mercenaries from Hong Kong
The Boxer's Omen (a.k.a. Mo)
Hong Kong Playboys
Little Dragon Maiden
Ode to Gallantry
Lo Yu Tan Chi

1983

Ghosts Galore
Lady Assassin
Roving Swordsman
Twinkle Twinkle Little Star
Shaolin Prince
a.k.a. U.S. title: Iron Fingers of Death
Lady Is the Boss
Tales of a Eunuch
Portrait in Crystal
Usurphers of the Emperor's Power
Long Road to Gallantry
The Weird Man
Holy Flame of the Martial World
Hong Kong, Hong Kong
Mad Man '83
Demon of the Lute
Let's Make Laugh
Bastard Swordsman
Supreme Swordsman
Shaolin Intruders
a.k.a. U.S. title: Battle For Shaolin
Men from the Gutter
Fast Fingers
Seeding of a Ghost
Cherie
Hsiao Kuei Chien Kuei
The Enchantress

1984

The Eight Diagram Pole Fighter
a.k.a. U.S. title: The Invincible Pole Fighters
Secret Service of the Imperial Court
a.k.a. Pool of Blood
Return of the Bastard Swordsman
Prince Charming
New Tales of the Flying Fox
My Darling Genie
Wits of the Brats
An Amorous Woman of Tang Dynasty
A Friend from Inner Space
Hidden Power of Dragon Sabre
The Siamese twins
Love in a Fallen City (傾城之戀)
Twin Bracelets
Opium and the Kung-Fu Master
a.k.a. U.S. title: Lightning Fists of Shaolin
Lust for the Love of a Chinese Courtesan
Pale Passion
Behind the Yellow Line
Cute Little Fellow
I Will Finally Knock You Down, Dad
Thunderclap

1985

The Master Strikes Back
Martial Arts of Shaolin
Hong Kong Godfather
Crazy Shaolin Disciples
Let's Make Laugh 2
The Flying Mr. B
This Man Is Dangerous
The Illegal Immigrant
Danger Has 2 Faces
Disciples of the 36th Chamber (Pi li shi jie)
a.k.a. U.S. title: Disciples of the Master Killer
Girl with the Diamond Slipper
Pursuit of a Killer
My Name Ain't Suzie
Puppy Love
Let's Have Baby
Young Vagabond
How to Choose a Royal Bride
Journey of the Doomed
He Who Wanders All Alone

1988
Painted Faces (co-produced by Golden Harvest)
Law Or Office

1989
Double Causes Trouble

1990
Look Out, Officer!

1992
Justice, My Foot!

1993
The Mad Monk

1994
Love on Delivery

1995
Loving You
Out of the Dark

1996
The King of Masks

1997
Lifeline
Hero

2003
Drunken Monkey

2009
Turning Point (co-produced with Television Broadcasts Limited)

2010
72 Tenants of Prosperity (co-produced with Television Broadcasts Limited and Sil-Metropole Organisation)
Perfect Wedding (co-produced with Television Broadcasts Limited and Sil-Metropole Organisation)
The Jade and the Pearl (co-produced with Television Broadcasts Limited and Emperor Motion Pictures)

2011
I Love Hong Kong (co-produced with Television Braodacasts Limited, Mei Ah Film Production and Sil-Metropole Organisation)
The Fortune Buddies (co-produced with Television Broadcasts Limited and Sil-Metropole Organisation)

See also
List of film production companies

References

External links
 4 big screen beauties from the golden age of Shaw Brothers films
 Hong Kong's TV and Film Publication Database, includes 300+ movie pamphlets, publicly available. Developed by HKBU Library

 
Shaw Brothers